Adolph Stanley Levey known professionally as Stan Levey (April 5, 1926 – April 19, 2005) was an American jazz drummer. He was known for working with Charlie Parker and Dizzy Gillespie in the early development of bebop during the 1940s, and in the next decade had a stint with bandleader Stan Kenton. Levey retired from music in the 1970s to work as a photographer.

Biography
He was born in Philadelphia, Pennsylvania, United States, Levey is considered one of the earliest bebop drummers, and one of the very few white drummers involved in the formative years of bebop. He played in Philadelphia with Dizzy Gillespie's group in 1942, at the age of 16. Soon after, he went to New York City, where he and Gillespie worked on 52nd Street with Charlie Parker and Oscar Pettiford.

After his tenure with the Stan Kenton Orchestra he moved to the West Coast in 1954, joining Howard Rumsey, Don Joham and the Lighthouse All-Stars, and was a major influence in West Coast jazz. Though "cool" jazz was common on the West Coast, Levey's crisp, melodic style continued to have more in common with bop than cool, and he inspired every group he ever played in. A right-handed person, Levey played the drums, as if left-handed. Levey has played on thousands of recordings, including those with musicians Dizzy Gillespie, Charlie Parker, Miles Davis, Stan Getz, Ella Fitzgerald, Peggy Lee, Frank Sinatra, Nat King Cole, and with bands such as that of Quincy Jones, and Skitch Henderson and The Tonight Show Band.

Levey retired from the music business in 1973 to become a professional photographer. He died at age 79, two months after surgery for cancer of the jaw, in Van Nuys, California. He was buried at the Forest Lawn, Hollywood Hills Cemetery in Los Angeles.

Discography
With Chet Baker and Art Pepper
The Route (Pacific Jazz, 1956)
With Buddy Bregman
Swinging Kicks (Verve, 1957)
With Conte Candoli
Conte Candoli Quartet (Mode, 1957)
Little Band Big Jazz (Crown, 1960)
With Victor Feldman
Vic Feldman on Vibes (Mode, 1957)
The Arrival of Victor Feldman (Contemporary, 1958)
Latinsville! (Contemporary, 1960)
With Stan Getz
Stan Getz Quartets (Prestige, 1949-50 [1955])
The Steamer (Verve, 1956)
Gerry Mulligan Meets Stan Getz (Verve, 1957) with Gerry Mulligan
With Dizzy Gillespie
For Musicians Only (Verve, 1956)
With Jimmy Giuffre
The Jimmy Giuffre Clarinet (Atlantic, 1956)
 Herb Ellis Meets Jimmy Giuffre (Verve, 1959) with Herb Ellis
With Stan Kenton
Popular Favorites by Stan Kenton (Capitol, 1953)
New Concepts of Artistry in Rhythm (Capitol, 1953)
Sketches on Standards (Capitol, 1953)
This Modern World (Capitol, 1953)
Portraits on Standards (Capitol, 1953)
Kenton Showcase (Capitol, 1954)
With Lee Konitz
Lee Konitz Plays (Disques Vogue, 1953)
With Oscar Peterson
Soft Sands (Universal/Polygram, 1957)
With Warne Marsh
Music for Prancing (Mode, 1957)
With Herb Ellis
Nothing But the Blues (Verve, 1958)
With Red Mitchell
West Coast Rhythm (Affinity, recorded 1954–1955, released 1982)
With Shorty Rogers
Shorty Rogers Plays Richard Rodgers (RCA Victor, 1957)
Portrait of Shorty (RCA Victor, 1957)
With Sonny Stitt
Previously Unreleased Recordings (Verve, 1960 [1973])

References

External links

Stan Levey, Web Site "Drummerworld"
Stan Levey, "The Last Post"

American jazz drummers
Jewish American jazz composers
20th-century American photographers
West Coast jazz drummers
Jewish American musicians
1926 births
2005 deaths
Burials at Forest Lawn Memorial Park (Hollywood Hills)
Jewish jazz musicians
20th-century American drummers
American male drummers
20th-century American composers
American male jazz composers
American jazz composers
20th-century American male musicians
20th-century jazz composers
20th-century American Jews
21st-century American Jews